Cardboard is a generic term for heavy paper-based products. The construction can range from a thick paper known as paperboard to corrugated fiberboard which is made of multiple plies of material. Natural cardboards can range from grey to light brown in color, depending on the specific product; dyes, pigments, printing, and coatings are available. 

The term "cardboard" has general use in English and French, but the term cardboard is deprecated in commerce and industry as not adequately defining a specific product. Material producers, container manufacturers, packaging engineers,
and standards organizations, use more specific terminology.

Usage statistics 
In 2020, the United States hit a record high in its yearly use of one of the most ubiquitous manufactured materials on earth, cardboard.  With around 80 per cent of all the products sold in the United States being packaged in cardboard, over 120 billion pieces were used that year. In the same year, over 13,000 separate pieces of consumer cardboard packaging was thrown away by American households, combined with all paper products and this constitutes almost 42 per cent of all solid waste generated by the United States annually. 

However, despite the sheer magnitude of paper waste, the vast majority of it is composed of one of the most successful and sustainable packaging materials of modern times - corrugated cardboard, known industrially as corrugated fiberboard. The above graph shows recycling of paper materials.

Types

Various card stocks

Various types of cards are available, which may be called "cardboard". Included are: thick paper (of various types) or pasteboard used for business cards, aperture cards, postcards, playing cards, catalog covers, binder's board for bookbinding, scrapbooking, and other uses which require higher durability than regular paper.

Paperboard

Paperboard is a paper-based material, usually more than about ten mils thick. It is often used for folding cartons, set-up boxes, carded packaging, etc. Configurations of paperboard include:
Containerboard, used in the production of corrugated fiberboard.
Folding boxboard, comprising multiple layers of chemical and mechanical pulp.
Solid bleached board, made purely from bleached chemical pulp and usually has a mineral or synthetic pigment.
Solid unbleached board, typically made of unbleached chemical pulp.
White lined chipboard, typically made from layers of waste paper or recycled fibers, most often with two to three layers of coating on the top and one layer on the reverse side. Because of its recycled content it will be grey from the inside.
Binder's board, a paperboard used in bookbinding for making hardcovers.
Currently, materials falling under these names may be made without using any actual paper.

Corrugated fiberboard

Corrugated fiberboard is a combination of paperboards, usually two flat liners and one inner fluted corrugated medium. It is often used for making corrugated boxes for shipping or storing products. This type of cardboard is also used by artists as original material for sculpting.

Recycling
Most types of cardboard are recyclable. Boards that are laminates, wax coated, or treated for wet-strength are often more difficult to recycle. Clean cardboard (i.e., cardboard that has not been subject to chemical coatings) "is usually worth recovering, although often the difference between the value it realizes and the cost of recovery is marginal". Cardboard can be recycled for industrial or domestic use. For example, cardboard may be composted or shredded for animal bedding.

History
The material had been first made in France, in 1751, by a pupil of Réaumur, and was used to reinforce playing cards.
The term cardboard has been used since at least 1848, when Anne Brontë mentioned it in her novel, The Tenant of Wildfell Hall. The Kellogg brothers first used paperboard cartons to hold their flaked corn cereal, and later, when they began marketing it to the general public, a heat-sealed bag of wax paper was wrapped around the outside of the box and printed with their brand name. This development marked the origin of the cereal box, though in modern times the sealed bag is plastic and is kept inside the box. The Kieckhefer Container Company, run by John W. Kieckhefer, was another early American packaging industry pioneer. It excelled in the use of fiber shipping containers, particularly the paper milk carton.

Examples of different end use

See also

Cardboard box
cardboard furniture
Carton
Corrugated box design
Folding carton
Juicebox (container)
Paperboard

References

Paper products